The Mongols Motorcycle Club, also known as the Mongols Nation or Mongol Brotherhood, is an international outlaw motorcycle club. The club is headquartered in Southern California and was originally formed in Montebello, California, in 1969. Law enforcement officials estimate approximately 2,000 full-patched members are in the club. The Mongols' main presence lies in Southern California, but they also have chapters nationwide in 14 states and internationally in 11 countries.

History
The Mongols Motorcycle Club was founded in Montebello, California on December 5, 1969. The first national president of the Mongols, Louis Costello, named the club in honor of Genghis Khan and the Mongol Empire. The club's founding members were reportedly a group of Hispanic bikers from East Los Angeles who had been rejected for membership in the Hells Angels. The Mongols' members initially consisted predominantly of Vietnam veterans. Within ten years of its foundation, the club had established chapters in the San Gabriel Valley, the San Fernando Valley, Long Beach and Bakersfield.

Insignia

The Mongols' insignia depicts a caricature of a Mongol warrior – sometimes reported to be Genghis Khan – sporting a topknot and sunglasses, and riding a motorcycle. This logo, along with other patches, is worn on members' "colors". Mongols patches utilize a black-and-white color scheme. According to law enforcement, a skull and crossbones patch worn by a Mongol indicates that the member has killed on behalf of the club.

The club's mottos include: "Respect few, fear none"; "Live Mongol, die Mongol";

Bans on club logos
After a long legal battle with the Department of Justice and ATF over the Mongols' MC patch, the Mongols won the rights to continued use and ownership of their patch.

In a 2015 racketeering case in Los Angeles, the Federal government tried and failed to use civil forfeiture laws to seize all rights to the Mongols emblems and patches in order to forbid members from wearing them. On September 16, 2015, Federal District Judge David O. Carter dismissed the case.

In January 2019, a California jury had ruled that federal prosecutors could strip the motorcycle club of its brand. An attempt to do so was rebuffed by the Central District of California Court, concluding that the seizure of the trademark violated the First Amendment right to free expression and the Eighth Amendment protection from excessive punishment.

Membership and organization
The Mongols organization is headed by a "mother chapter", based in Commerce, California, and a national president. Each club chapter pays financial tribute to the "mother chapter" and is governed by an officer corps, consisting of a president, vice president, sergeant-at-arms and a secretary/treasurer. The Mongols have an estimated membership of between 1,000 and 2,000 internationally, with chapters in 17 countries; Australia, Belgium, Brazil, Canada, England, France, Germany, Israel, Italy, Malaysia, Mexico, the Netherlands, Mexico, Singapore, Sweden, Thailand and the United States.

In the United States, the Mongols permit Hispanic and White males as members. Prospective members are required to own a Harley-Davidson motorcycle and must serve as a "prospect" before being initiated into the club. Mongols members are required to pay a monthly fee and attend chapter meetings. The club's bylaws are contained in a 70-page constitution, which also features the following "10 Commandments":

 A Mongol never lies to another Mongol 
 A Mongol never steals from another Mongol 
 A Mongol never messes with another Mongol’s ol’ lady 
 A Mongol never causes another Mongol to get arrested in any way, shape, or form 
 A Mongol never uses his patch for any personal gain or any criminal or illegal activities 
 A Mongol can never abuse or sell drugs period 
 A Mongol should either be legitimately employed full time or actively seeking legitimate employment 
 A Mongol (patch or no patch) should never use his patch for any personal gain and should never be involved in any criminal or illegal activities 
 All Mongols should be brotherly and respectful to one another and a Mongol should never fight with another Mongol 
 A Mongol should always be there for another Mongol… A Mongol always has another Mongol’s back

Criminal allegations and incidents
Mongols members have a long history in the illegal drugs trade (especially methamphetamine), money laundering, robbery, extortion, firearms violations, murder, and assault, among other crimes. Current club president David Santillan denies that the club as a whole is a criminal enterprise, and attorneys for the club claim that it has changed its code of conduct to exclude drug abusers and criminals.

Germany
A German chapter of the Mongols MC was founded in Bremen by members of the local crime syndicate run by Lebanese immigrants in 2010. It was the first time that a Muslim clan-based crime syndicate in Germany became active in the field of outlaw motorcycle clubs.

Organized crime in Bremen is dominated by the Miri-Clan, a large family of Lebanese origin with more than 10,000 members, who first migrated to Germany beginning in the late 1970s, and rose to national notoriety with a number of large-scale criminal activities in 2010.

According to Andreas Weber, the state of Bremen's chief of criminal investigation, the new Mongols chapter is only nominally a motorcycle group. Clan members do not have motorcycle licences and drive around the city in cars. Presumably, they are interested in associating themselves with the U.S. motorcycle club primarily to profit from their infrastructure and trading channels in drug trafficking. The president of Mongols Bremen, "Mustafa B." accidentally killed himself with his bike as a novice licence holder briefly after the chapter's foundation. He was presumably succeeded by "Ibrahim M.", who is on record with 147 felonies ranging from grievous bodily harm to illegal possession of a weapon.

Local daily newspaper Kölnische Rundschau reports that a further German Mongols chapter has become active in Cologne, which is a traditional Hells Angels area.

In 2016, the last Mongols chapter in Bremen closed.

United States
The Mongols are one of the largest motorcycle gangs in the United States, with approximately 800 to 850 members and 70 chapters in 19 U.S. states. The club is primarily based on the West Coast and in the Southwest of the country, with the majority of its membership consisting of Hispanic men from the Los Angeles area. The club is involved in the transportation and distribution of cocaine, marijuana and methamphetamine, the interstate theft of stolen motorcycles, as well as violent crime including assault, intimidation and murder. The club is allied with the Mexican Mafia and Sureño gangs, as well as the Tijuana Cartel and the Nazi Lowriders, while rival gangs include the Bandidos, the Hells Angels, the Outlaws and Vagos.

California
Members of the Glendale Mongols chapter, along with bikers from the San Bernardino chapter of the Hells Angels, the Straight Satans of Venice, and the Glendale Night Riders, committed a sexual assault on a fifteen year-old girl in August 1972. On April 5, 1973, Mongols member Ferman Benavides was among eleven motorcycle gang members convicted in Los Angeles of rape and sex perversion.

The Mongols' rivalry with the Hells Angels began when they started wearing a California "bottom rocker" – a patch displayed on a biker's "colors" denoting the club's territory – after having previously listed only individual chapter locations on their "colors". As the dominant club in the state, the Hells Angels claimed exclusive rights to the California "rocker" and took offense to the Mongols' wearing of the patch.

In 1998, Bureau of Alcohol, Tobacco, Firearms and Explosives (ATF) agent William Queen infiltrated the club, eventually becoming a full-patch member and rising to the rank of chapter vice-president using the undercover alias of Billy St. John. In April 2000, based on evidence gathered during Queen's 28-month undercover time with the club, 54 Mongols were arrested. All but one of the accused were later convicted of crimes, including drug trafficking, motorcycle theft, and conspiracy to commit murder.

In order to bolster their membership during the 1990s, the Mongols began recruiting members from Sureño street gangs. Although many of these gang members did not own a motorcycle, which is in breach of the Mongols' bylaws, the club relaxed their standards in order to match the rival Hells Angels in numbers. Some East Los Angeles gang veterans joined the Mongols' enforcer squad and began wearing an "ELA Enforcer" patch. Due to the Mongols' increasing presence in the drug market, the Mexican Mafia requested payment from the club. The Mongols refused, causing a war which resulted in casualties on each side. The conflict between the Mongols and the Mexican Mafia was ultimately resolved, and the gangs continue to cooperate in drug trafficking.

Mongols member Christopher Ablett turned himself in to authorities in Bartlesville, Oklahoma, on October 4, 2008, after going on the run for the murder of Hells Angels President Mark "Papa" Guardado in San Francisco, California, earlier that year. His bond was set at $5 million. He was convicted of murder in aid of racketeering and three gun charges on February 23, 2012, in San Francisco.

On October 28, 2014, in San Gabriel, California, Mongols member David Martinez allegedly shot and killed Pomona Police SWAT Team member Shaun Diamond. Diamond was shot in the back of the base of his neck with a shotgun during the service of a search warrant. Martinez shot Diamond after the officer turned away from the doorway following the breaching procedure. Officer Diamond died at dawn, October 29, 2014, at Huntington Memorial Hospital. Judge M. L. Villar, at the preliminary hearing, added a special gang allegation to the capital murder charges after the prosecution connected him to a Mongols chapter in Montebello, California. His initial trial, which started in 2019, was deemed a mistrial after he was found not guilty of first-degree murder; a hung jury occurred with all other charges. Martinez faces the death penalty if convicted.

Operation Black Rain was an operation by the ATF in 2008 to stop alleged criminal activity within the Mongols. On October 21, 2008, 38 members, including Ruben "Doc" Cavazos, were taken into Federal custody after four ATF agents infiltrated the group for a second time, becoming full patch members. 110 arrest warrants and 160 search warrants were issued in California, Ohio, Colorado, Nevada, Washington, and Oregon.
On October 23, 2008, US District Court Judge Florence-Marie Cooper granted an injunction that prohibits club members, their family members and associates from wearing, licensing, selling, or distributing the logo, which typically depicts the profile of a Mongolian warrior wearing sunglasses, because according to the police, they use the logo and names as an identity and as a form of intimidation to fulfill their goals. Prosecutors requested the injunction after authorities arrested dozens of Mongols under a racketeering indictment. The club president Ruben Cavazos and others pleaded guilty to the racketeering charge, and Cavazos was sentenced to serve 14 years in the penitentiary.
Cavazos was voted out of the club by its members on August 30, 2008.

A planned weekend meeting in Lancaster, California, expected to draw 800 Mongols and their families, was blocked after city officials shut down and fenced off the hotel they had booked for the event, which coincided with the "Celebrate Downtown Lancaster" festival. The mayor had previously threatened to shut down the hotel over unpaid taxes if the agreement to host the Mongols was not canceled. An attorney for the Mongols said he planned to sue the city and the mayor, potentially for civil rights violations, after previously threatening to sue the hotel for breach of contract should they comply with the mayor's demands. Mayor R. Rex Parris said he wants to keep the Mongols out because they "are engaged in domestic terrorism...and they kill our children." The television show America's Most Wanted had exclusive access to the operation, and broadcast behind-the-scenes footage of the many arrests.

Nevada
Tensions between the Mongols and the Hells Angels increased as the Mongols expanded into the Angels' home territory of Northern California. In 2002, members of the Mongols and the Hells Angels had a confrontation at the Harrah's Laughlin Casino in Laughlin, Nevada, that left three bikers dead. Mongol Anthony "Bronson" Barrera, 43, was stabbed to death and two Hells AngelsJeramie Bell, 27, and Robert Tumelty, 50were shot to death. On February 23, 2007, Hells Angels members James Hannigan and Rodney Cox were sentenced to two years in prison for their respective roles in the incident. Cox and Hannigan were captured on videotape confronting Mongols inside the casino.

On December 20, 2008, a group of Mongols arrived at a Las Vegas chapel for the wedding of a fellow member, only to find a local chapter of Hells Angels there finishing a ceremony of their own. According to local news outlet KTNV Channel 13, the Hells Angels attacked the Mongols members, sending three to the hospital, two of whom suffered from stab wounds. No arrests were made, and local authorities report that they are looking for suspects involved in the attack.

Oregon
The Mongols established chapters in Oregon in 2007 and 2008, "astonishing" authorities, who described it as a breach of motorcycle club code of conduct, and who expected a turf war with rival motorcycle clubs to result.

See also
List of outlaw motorcycle clubs
Criminal Law (Criminal Organisations Disruption) Amendment Act 2013
Under and Alone by William Queen

References

External links
 
 

 
Organizations established in 1969
1969 establishments in California
Organizations based in Los Angeles
Clubs and societies in California
Hispanic and Latino American culture in Los Angeles
Commerce, California
Montebello, California
Outlaw motorcycle clubs
Motorcycle clubs in the United States
Transnational organized crime
Organised crime groups in Germany
Organized crime groups in the United States
Gangs in California
Gangs in Los Angeles
Gangs in Nevada
Gangs in Oregon